Tom Brown of Culver is a 1932 American pre-Code film directed by William Wyler.

Plot
A young man attends Culver Military Academy. He is the only son of a deceased soldier who won the Congressional Medal of Honor.

References

External links
Tom Brown of Culver at IMDb
Tom Brown of Culver at TCMDB
Tom Brown of Culver at New York Times
Tom Brown of Culver at Tyrone Power.com

1932 films
1932 drama films
Films set in boarding schools
American drama films
American black-and-white films
Culver Academies alumni
Films directed by William Wyler
1930s American films